Gonodonta clotilda is a species of fruit-piercing moth in the family Erebidae. It is found in Central and South America.

References

Gonodonta
Moths described in 1790